The Škoda 06 T is a five-carbody-section low-floor bi-directional tram, developed by Škoda for the Italian city of Cagliari.

The vehicle is six-axle and fully air-conditioned, and is based on the Škoda 05 T. The low-floor area represents 65% of the entire vehicle floor.

Production 
 9 trams have been produced and delivered to Cagliari.

External links 

 Information on Škoda webpages
 Tram YouTube videos

Tram vehicles of Italy
Škoda trams

de:Škoda Elektra#06T für Cagliari